The Self Destruct Tour was a concert tour in support of industrial rock band Nine Inch Nails' album The Downward Spiral, which took place in early 1994, running until mid-1996, and was broken into eight legs.

Overview
The tour was filmed for the Closure documentary that documented live performances as well as the band from 1989–1991. The second tape in the set – issued in late 1997 – featured the band's music videos. A DVD version, featuring bonus content, was planned for 2005.  However, licensing issues forced an indefinite delay. An alleged "prototype" of the DVDs eventually leaked to torrent websites in 2006. This release has been attributed to Trent Reznor himself.

This was Nine Inch Nails' first tour since the early 1990s shows for Pretty Hate Machine. During this time, NIN's music became angrier and more aggressive via Broken and The Downward Spiral, which led to the concerts being often violent and personal, with band members injuring themselves. The stage set consisted of grungy curtains that would fall for visuals during songs such as 'Hurt', or rise during more aggressive songs. The back of the stage was littered with darker and standing lights, with very few conventional lights.

Reznor overhauled the band lineup and image for the tour. Robin Finck and Danny Lohner joined to play guitar and bass guitar, respectively. Chris Vrenna and James Woolley were brought back from the Pretty Hate Machine Tour Series.  Image-wise, instead of the sloppy, low-budget style for previous tours, the band often dressed in black leather smothered in cornstarch, with members often changing their hairstyles radically for every concert. Finck used makeup to hide his eyebrows, and Reznor would don 'fishnet gloves' (as they would come to be known) for the show. The showy yet intense style earned comparisons to David Bowie, of whom Reznor was a fan. Later in the tour, Reznor's protégé Marilyn Manson would often join the frontman on stage to sing their songs—as evidenced in the Closure documentary.

The tour included a set at Woodstock '94 broadcast on pay-per-view and seen in as many as 24 million homes. The band being covered in mud was a result of pre-concert backstage play, contrary to the belief that it was an attention-grabbing ploy, thus making it difficult for Reznor to navigate the stage: Reznor pushed Lohner into the mud pit as the concert began and saw mud from his hair going into his eyes while performing. NIN was widely proclaimed to have "stolen the show" from its popular contemporaries, mostly classic rock bands, and its fan base expanded. The band received considerable mainstream success thereafter, performing with significantly higher production values and the addition of various theatrical visual elements. Its performance of "Happiness in Slavery" from the Woodstock concert earned the group a Grammy Award for Best Metal Performance in 1995. Entertainment Weekly commented about the band's Woodstock '94 performance: "Reznor unstrings rock to its horrifying, melodramatic core--an experience as draining as it is exhilarating". Despite this acclaim, Reznor attributed his dislike of the concert to its technical difficulties.

The main leg of the tour featured Marilyn Manson as the supporting act. Bassist Jeordie White – then playing under the pseudonym "Twiggy Ramirez" – later played bass with NIN from 2005 to 2007. After another tour leg supporting the remix album Further Down the Spiral, NIN contributed to the Alternative Nation Festival in Australia and subsequently embarked on the Dissonance Tour, which included 26 performances with co-headliner David Bowie. NIN opened the shows, their set transitioning into Bowie's set with joint performances of both bands' songs. However, the audiences reportedly did not respond positively, owing to the acts' differences.

The tour concluded with "Nights of Nothing": a three-night showcase of performances from Nothing Records bands Marilyn Manson, Prick, Meat Beat Manifesto, and Pop Will Eat Itself, then a 80-minute set by NIN. Kerrang! described the NIN set as "tight, brash and dramatic", but was disappointed at the lack of new material. On the second of the three nights, Richard Patrick was briefly reunited with the band and contributed guitar to a performance of "Head Like a Hole". After the Self Destruct tour, Chris Vrenna, member of the live band since 1988 and frequent contributor to Nine Inch Nails studio recordings, left the act permanently to pursue a career in producing and to form Tweaker.

"On a lot of that tour, I don't even remember playing the shows," Reznor sighed in 1999. "I got off the bus after two years going, 'Who am I?' That tour was really about excess… We were all drug addicts and full-on party machines, and that was one of the factors that led to me being in a very depressed state at the end."

Personnel
 Trent Reznor – lead vocals, guitar, keyboards, synthesizers, bass
 Robin Finck – guitar, keyboards, synthesizers, backing vocals
 Danny Lohner – bass, guitar, keyboards, backing vocals
 Chris Vrenna – drums
 James Woolley – keyboards, synthesizers programming, backup vocals (March 9, 1994 – December 11, 1994)
 Charlie Clouser – keyboards, synthesizers, programming, backup vocals (December 28, 1994 – September 8, 1996)

Warm-up leg

Typical set list
 "Pinion"
 "Terrible Lie"
 "Sin"
 "March of the Pigs"
 "Piggy"
 "Reptile"
 "Wish"
 "Ruiner"
 "Suck"
 "Happiness in Slavery"
 "The Only Time"
 "Get Down, Make Love"
 "Down in It"
 "Head Like a Hole"

Tour dates

North American & Europe leg
Reeling from the success of Pretty Hate Machine and Broken as well as the band's departure from TVT Records, the nearly immediate success of The Downward Spiral led to Nine Inch Nails playing larger venues.  This debuted the band's new grungy and messy image in which band members would often come out in ragged clothes slathered in corn starch.  They would often destroy their instruments at the end of concerts, attack each other, and stage-dive into the crowd.  This led to Nine Inch Nails's notoriety as a live act.  The shows often consisted of songs from Pretty Hate Machine, Broken, The Downward Spiral, as well as songs such as "Get Down Make Love" and "Dead Souls", which were formerly staples of their live show.

Typical set list
 "Pinion"
 "Terrible Lie"
 "Sin"
 "March of the Pigs"
 "Something I Can Never Have"
 "Closer"
 "Reptile"
 "Wish"
 "Suck"
 "The Only Time"
 "Get Down, Make Love"
 "Down in It"
 "Big Man with a Gun"
 "Head Like a Hole"
 "Dead Souls"
 "Help Me I Am in Hell"
 "Happiness in Slavery"

Support act
 Die Krupps
 Fem2Fem
 Marilyn Manson
 PIG
 Treponem Pal
 Type O Negative

Tour dates

North American leg #2
An incident occurred at the tour's Delta Center stop on October 18, 1994 in Salt Lake City. Manson was prohibited from performing after the venue owner took offense to Manson's merchandise which included a band t-shirt with the satirical message, "Warning: Heavy Metal Music contains satanic messages that will KILL GOD in your impressionable teenage minds. As a result, you will be convinced to KILL YOUR MOM AND DAD, and eventually, in all act of hopeless, suicidal, 'rock and roll' behaviour, you will KILL YOURSELF. Please, burn your records while there is still hope." During Nine Inch Nail's set, Reznor invited Manson on stage who ripped apart a Book of Mormon then threw it into the audience asking, "Do you let Him [God] run your lives?"

"You can't explain this to people who weren't around it," recalled Reznor of this leg of the tour. "It's not sane, but imagine the kind of people who came to that show, and they're all trying to outdo each other. Some of the guys in the (Jim Rose) Circus have horns and a tail, and one of the guys was trying to have trepanation performed on him in my studio: drilling a hole in the back of the head so the spinal fluid leaks out and you're high for ever. That's the level it was getting to… I'm going to point the finger at Jim Rose. The first time I was ever around him, I was eating a light bulb, thinking, 'What am I doing?'"

Typical set list
 "Pinion"
 "Mr. Self Destruct"
 "Sin"
 "March of the Pigs"
 "Piggy"
 "Reptile"
 "Gave Up
 "Happiness in Slavery"
 "Eraser"
 "Hurt"
 "The Downward Spiral"
 "Wish"
 "Suck"
 "The Only Time" or "Ruiner"
 "Down in It"
 "Head Like a Hole"
 "Dead Souls"
 "Closer"
 "I Do Not Want This"
 "Something I Can Never Have"

Support acts
 Hole
 Jim Rose Circus
 Marilyn Manson
 Melvins
 Pop Will Eat Itself

Tour dates

Oceania leg
The leg was a part of the Alternative Nation Festival.

Typical set list
 "Pinion"
 "Mr. Self Destruct"
 "Sin"
 "March of the Pigs"
 "Piggy"
 "Closer"
 "Reptile"
 "Gave Up
 "Wish"
 "Dead Souls"
 "Help Me I Am in Hell"
 "Happiness in Slavery"
 "Head Like a Hole"

Tour dates

Dissonance leg
The band co-headlined with David Bowie on the North American leg on Bowie's Outside Tour in 1995.

Typical set list
 "Terrible Lie"
 "March of the Pigs"
 "The Becoming"
 "Sanctified"
 "Piggy (Nothing Can Stop Me Now)"
 "Burn"
 "Closer" or "Closer To God"
 "Wish"
 "Gave Up"
 "Down in It"
 "Eraser" (Instrumental version)

Nine Inch Nails and David Bowie:
 "Subterraneans"
 "Scary Monsters"
 "Reptile"
 "Hallo Spaceboy"
 "Hurt"

Tour dates

North American club leg

Typical set list
 "Head Like a Hole"
 "Terrible Lie"
 "Mr. Self Destruct"
 "March of the Pigs"
 "Something I Can Never Have"
 "Reptile"
 "Suck"
 "Get Down, Make Love"
 "Piggy"
 "Closer"
 "Down in It"
 "Wish"
 "Gave Up"
 "Happiness in Slavery" 
 "Sanctified"
 "Dead Souls"

Tour dates

Nights of Nothing leg
Nights of Nothing was an industry showcase organized by Reznor of his vanity label, Nothing Records', talent roster. It ran from August 30, 1996 to September 8, 1996 and spanned three shows. The shows featured performances by his band, Meat Beat Manifesto, Marilyn Manson, Filter and other "special guests."

Marilyn Manson incident

Following the conclusion of the arduous recording sessions for Marilyn Manson's sophomore album Antichrist Superstar, acrimony between the band, Reznor, and Nothing Records was at its peak. The band nevertheless grudgingly agreed to fulfill their contractual obligation to promote the record a little over a month prior to its release by performing on the second evening of Nights of Nothing, at the Irving Plaza on September 5 1996. While performing the final song of their five-song set, "1996", Manson picked up a weighted microphone stand and proceeded to smash the drumkit. Drummer Ginger Fish kept playing what remained of his disintegrating equipment until Manson accidentally struck him on the side of the head with the weighted base, sending him face first to the floor unconscious. Manson then walked offstage while the crowd looked on to see whether or not the drummer was alright. Fish managed to crawl a few inches before he collapsed and was carried away by road crew to the hospital. Fish's injury necessitated five stitches and a brief rumor spread the incident was a deliberate assault. Fish later recounted that had he not turned his head at the last moment the stand would have hit him directly in the face and said of the incident, "we just get a little carried away sometimes."

Typical set list
 "Terrible Lie"
 "March of the Pigs"
 "Sanctified"
 "Wish"
 "Suck"
 "Down in It"
 "Animal" (Prick cover)
 "Tough" (Prick cover)
 "R.S.V.P." (Pop Will Eat Itself cover, with Clint Mansell)
 "Wise Up! Sucker" (Pop Will Eat Itself cover, with Clint Mansell)
 "Head Like a Hole"
 "Something I Can Never Have"

Tour dates

Canceled dates

References

Bibliography
 

1994 concert tours
1995 concert tours
1996 concert tours
Nine Inch Nails concert tours